The Scotts Miracle-Gro Company is an American multinational corporation headquartered in Marysville, Ohio, where O.M. Scott began selling lawn seed in 1868. The company manufactures and sells consumer lawn, garden and pest control products, and soilless indoor gardening equipment. In the U.S., the company manufactures Scotts, Miracle-Gro and Ortho brands. The company also markets consumer Roundup.

In 2021, despite billions of dollars in awards to Roundup's victims and their next-of-kin, Scotts Miracle-Gro was supportive of their marketing arrangement.

History

Scotts was founded in 1868 by Orlando M. Scott as a premium seed company for the U.S. agricultural industry. In the early 1900s, the company began a lawn grass seed business for homeowners, and in 1924, became the first company to ship grass seed products directly to stores. Prior to 1924, Scotts products were only available through the mail. By 1940, Scotts's sales had reached $1,000,000 and the company had 66 associates.

In 1971, privately owned O.M. Scott & Sons was purchased by ITT, an international business conglomerate. Fifteen years later, in 1986, Scotts became an independent company again through a leveraged buyout. In 1992, Scotts became a publicly traded company with an initial offering of $19.00 a share and three years later merged with Miracle-Gro, a gardening company, to create the Scotts Miracle-Gro Company.

During the 2012 United States presidential election, the company endorsed the election of Republican Party candidate Mitt Romney.

Sale of bird seed in 20052008
On January 27, 2012, Scotts Miracle-Gro pled guilty in federal court and paid $4.5 million in fines for selling 73 million units of bird seed between November 2005 to March 2008 that was coated with pesticide known to be deadly to birds and fish. Pesticides were added to protect the product from insects during storage, including Storcide II, that was clearly marked as extremely toxic to birds. Records show that Scotts Miracle-Gro's own experts warned of the risk in the summer and fall of 2007 but they continued to sell the product until March 2008. In 2008, Scotts Miracle-Gro also falsified pesticide registration numbers required by the U.S. Environmental Protection Agency on its products.

On September 7, 2012, a federal court ordered Scotts to pay a $4 million fine and perform community service for 11 criminal violations of the Federal Insecticide, Fungicide and Rodenticide Act (FIFRA). In a separate agreement with the Environmental Protection Agency, Scotts agreed to pay more than $6 million in penalties and spend $2 million on environmental projects. According to the Justice Department, both the criminal and civil settlements are the largest under FIFRA to date.

GM Grass
Scotts has developed several genetically modified grasses, including herbicide-tolerant Kentucky bluegrass and creeping bentgrass.

Peat bogs in the UK
In 2001, Scotts was involved in a major dispute with nature conservation bodies and the UK Government about the future of several peat bogs in the north of England. During the course of the dispute Nick Kirkbride, the then managing director of Scotts in Britain, described the peat bogs as having "no more conservation interest than a ploughed field". The peat bogs were eventually saved from further destruction by the payment by the UK government of compensation of £17 million to Scotts for loss of the right to extract peat.

Lunarly Subscription Service
In July 2018, Scotts collaborated with BuzzFeed Inc. to develop a subscription service called Lunarly, which mails crystals, house plants, and other wellness items based on the lunar calendar. The joint effort with BuzzFeed's Product Labs, facilitated by ad agency MullenLowe U.S., is an attempt to make gardening popular among millennial women, thereby opening up avenues for the 150+ year-old company to make inroads with younger consumers. While reviews of the self-care boxes have been mixed, they have repeatedly sold out with over $1 million in incremental sales as of May 2019.

Mergers and acquisitions
 1914 – The O.M. Scott & Sons Company was incorporated
 1992 – Scotts acquired Republic Tool & Manufacturing Company
 1993 – Scotts acquired the Grace-Sierra Horticultural Products Company
 1995 – Scotts merged with Miracle-Gro Products, Inc.
 1997 – Scotts purchases Miracle Care Garden Ltd.
 1997 – Scotts acquired Emerald Green Lawn Service, which would become Scotts Lawn Service in 1998.
 1997 – Scotts purchased privately held Levington Horticulture Ltd.
 1998 – The company acquired 80% ownership of plant breeding company Sanford Scientific, Inc. (SSI).
 1998 – Scotts acquired Rhône-Poulenc Jardin
 1998 – Scotts acquired the Shamrock brand of U.K. and Irish peat products form Bord na Mona, Ireland.
 1998 – Scotts enters into collaboration with the Monsanto Company
 1998 – Scotts completes an acquisition with ASEF
 1999 – Scotts completes agreements with Monsanto Company for exclusive U.S., Canada, U.K., France, Germany, and Australia agency and marketing rights to Monsanto's consumer Roundup herbicide products and for the purchase of the Ortho and related lawn and garden businesses.
 2000 – Scotts acquires Substral.  Scotts also purchases Smith & Hawken
 2005 – Scotts acquires the Morning Song brand
 2014 – Scotts Miracle-Gro sells wild bird food line to Global Harvest Foods Ltd.
 2015 – Scotts Miracle-Gro buys General Hydroponics and Vermicrop Organics to move into the marijuana market, under the name Hawthorne Gardening Company
 2015 – Scotts Lawn Service is merged with ServiceMaster's TruGreen lawn care service
 2016 – Scotts acquires Blossom, a California manufacturer of Internet enabled sprinkler systems.
2016 – Scotts acquires a minority share of Bonnie Plants.
2017 – Scotts sells its European and Australian operations and brands to Exponent Private Equity LLP.
 2017 – Scotts acquires Can-Filters, a Canadian-based carbon filter manufacturer and fan wholesaler under their Hawthorne Gardening Co. brand.
 2018 – Scotts Miracle-Gro announced its plan to acquire Sunlight Supply Inc., a hydroponics supplier, for $450 million in cash and stock.
 2019 – Scotts sells its minority stake in TruGreen for $234 million.
2020 – Scotts acquires AeroGrow International lnc., a hydroponics maker.
2022 – Scotts acquires Luxx Lighting Co., A horticultural lighting maker.

Brands

United States

 AeroGrow
 Black Magic
 Blossom
 Botanicare LLC
 Bovung
 Can-Filters
 Earthgro
 Ecoscraps
 Gavita
 General Hydroponics
 Greendigs
 Greenlight
 Hawthorne Gardening Company
 Hyponex
 Lunarly
 Miracle-Gro
 Ortho
 Ortho Elementals
 Osmocote
 Scotts
 Scotts Lawn Service
 Supersoil
 TOMCAT
 Vermicrop Organics
 Whitney Farms

Outside the U.S.

 Gavita Holland B.V.
 Pathclear
 Scotts Ecosense
 Weedol

References

External links

1868 establishments in Ohio
Companies listed on the New York Stock Exchange
Horticultural companies of the United States
Lawn care
Manufacturing companies based in Ohio
Manufacturing companies established in 1868
Union County, Ohio
1992 initial public offerings